She most commonly refers to:
She (pronoun), the third person singular, feminine, nominative case pronoun in modern English.

She or S.H.E. may also refer to:

Literature and films
She: A History of Adventure, an 1887 novel by H. Rider Haggard, and its film adaptations:
She (1911 film), a silent short film featuring Marguerite Snow
She (1916 film), a silent film produced in the UK
She (1917 film), a silent film starring Valeska Suratt
She (1925 film), a silent film starring Betty Blythe
She (1935 film), featuring Helen Gahagan
She (1965 film), starring Ursula Andress
She (1984 film), starring Sandahl Bergman
She (2001 film), with Ophélie Winter
She (1954 film), a West German comedy film directed by Rolf Thiele
She (1967 film), an Australian TV play ballet
She (magazine), British monthly magazine, 1955–2011
She (Netflix series), Indian crime drama, 2020

Music

Artists
S.H.E, a Taiwanese girl band
SHE, or Solid HarmoniE, British pop girl group formed in 1996
she (band), a virtual band formed in 2003 by Lain Trzaska
She (American band), a Sacramento garage rock band active from 1964 to 1971

Albums
she (Dalbello album), 1987
She (Harry Connick Jr. album), 1994
She (Jerusalem album), 2010
She (Stiltskin album), 2006
She (Viktor Lazlo album), 1985
She (Wendy Matthews album), 2008
s/he (album), by s/he, 2011
She (EP), by Heo Young-saeng, 2013
She, an EP by Monni, 2014

Songs
"She" (Charles Aznavour song), 1974, covered by Elvis Costello in the film Notting Hill
"She" (Green Day song), 1994
"She" (Groove Coverage song), 2004
"She" (Kiss song), 1975
"She" (Tommy James and the Shondells song), 1970, from Travelin
"She" (Tyler, the Creator song), 2011
"She" (Zayn song), 2016
"She" (Selena Gomez song), 2020
"She", by Dodie Clark from the EP Human, 2019
"She", by Edie Brickell from the album Shooting Rubberbands at the Stars, 1988
"She", by Fat Mattress from the album Fat Mattress II, 1970
"She", by Gram Parsons from the album GP, 1973, covered by Emmylou Harris on her album Luxury Liner, 1977
"She", by Harry Connick Jr. from his She, 1994
"She", by Harry Styles from the album Fine Line, 2019
"She", by Hoodoo Gurus from the album Mars Needs Guitars!
"She", by Jeff Lynne from the album Long Wave, 2012
"She", by Jerusalem from the album She, 2010
"She", by Keyshia Cole from the album Point of No Return, 2014
"She", by the Misfits from the album Static Age, 1997
"She", by the Monkees from the album More of the Monkees, 1967
"She", by Patrick Sky from the album Photographs
"She", by Saves the Day from the album In Reverie, 2003
"She", by Stiltskin from the album She, 2006
"She", by Suede from the album Coming Up, 1996
"She", by the Sundays from the album Static & Silence, 1997
"She", by Tenpenny Joke from the album Ambush on All Sides, 2005
"She", by Tommy Boyce and Bobby Hart, from the album, More of the Monkees (1967)
"She", by Viktor Lazlo from the album She, 1985

Television
"She" (Angel), a 2000 episode of the television series Angel
She (TV channel), an Israeli television channel
"She", an episode of The Good Doctor

Acronyms and codes

Science
SHE, Spin Hall effect, a transport phenomenon in a sample carrying electric current
Standard hydrogen electrode
Système Hydrologique Européen, a hydrological transport model

Other

Society for the History of Emotions within the ARC Centre of Excellence for the History of Emotions
Shenyang Taoxian International Airport, IATA code
Safety, Health and Environment, or environment, health and safety
Sherborne railway station, Dorset, England, code
Siu Hei stop, Hong Kong, MTR code

China

Places
She County, Anhui 
She Prefecture, 589-1121
She County, Hebei
She River, or Sheshui, Hubei

People
She people
Shehua, a Sinitic language
She language, a Hmong–Mien language, Guangdong
She (surname)
She (Qi) (died 613 BC), ruler
Empress She (died 397), Later Qin dynasty

See also

Shi (disambiguation)
He and She (disambiguation)
Shae (disambiguation)